Martin Hill is a conspicuous ice-free hill at the west side of Whitehall Glacier in the Victory Mountains of Victoria Land, Antarctica. It was mapped by the U.S. Geological Survey from surveys and from U.S. Navy air photos from 1960–62, and named by the Advisory Committee on Antarctic Names for P.J. Martin, New Zealand senior scientist at Hallett Station, 1961.

References

Hills of Victoria Land
Borchgrevink Coast